The Robber Kitten is a 1935 Walt Disney Silly Symphonies cartoon, directed by David Hand.

Plot
A kitten named Ambrose is dreaming about running away and becoming a robber. Calling himself "Butch" at the beginning of the cartoon, he is seen play–acting a stagecoach robbery, which is interrupted by his mother calling for him to take a bath. Not wanting to take a bath in the first place, Ambrose runs away and becomes a robber, first stealing a bag of cookies. His first target turns out to be an actual robber: Dirty Bill the bulldog. Dirty Bill asks Ambrose if he has pulled off any robberies lately, and Ambrose tells him, "Just this morning, I held up a stagecoach." Then Dirty Bill asks Ambrose where his loot is, so Ambrose shows Dirty Bill the bag of cookies. Imagining that the bag is full of gold, Dirty Bill demands it and threatens Ambrose. Scared, Ambrose runs home and jumps into his bathtub, acting as if nothing else has happened.

Comic adaptation
The cartoon short was adapted in a Silly Symphony comic strip sequence by Ted Osborne and Al Taliaferro, which ran from February 24 to April 21, 1935. The  storyline was titled "The Adventures of Ambrose the Robber Kitten". It was also translated and published in Austria (1938), Australia, Belgium (1952), Brazil (1979), Finland (1935), France (1935), Germany (2003), United Kingdom (1936), Italy (1935), Spain (1935), Yugoslavia (1936).

Voice cast
 Ambrose: Shirley Reed
 Dirty Bill: Billy Bletcher
 Horse whinny, Ambrose's Tarzan yell: Clarence Nash
 Ambrose's mother: Elvia Allman

Home media
The short was released on December 4, 2001, on Walt Disney Treasures: Silly Symphonies - The Historic Musical Animated Classics.

It was also released on the Walt Disney Animation Collection: Classic Short Films Volume 5: Wind in the Willows DVD in 2009.

References

External links 
 
 
 The Robber Kitten at the Encyclopedia of Disney Animated Shorts

1935 films
1935 short films
1935 animated films
Silly Symphonies
1930s Disney animated short films
Animated films about cats
Films directed by David Hand
Films produced by Walt Disney
Films scored by Frank Churchill
American animated short films
Animated films about dogs
Films adapted into comics
1930s American films